Jinshui District is one of 6 urban districts of the prefecture-level city of Zhengzhou, the capital of Henan Province, South Central China. The District is 135.3 square km, in which the urban area is 70.65 square km. The total population is 1.4 million.

The district is seat to the Henan provincial government as well as the most developed city district in Zhengzhou and the province.

Administrative divisions
Jinshui District has 17 subdistricts :
Subdistricts:
Jingba Road Subdistrict
Huayuan Road Subdistrict
Renmin Road Subdistrict
Duling Street Subdistrict
Dashiqiao Subdistrict
Nanyang Road Subdistrict
Nanyang New Village Subdistrict
Wenhua Road Subdistrict
Fengchan Road Subdistrict
Dongfeng Road Subdistrict
Beilin Road Subdistrict
Weilai Road Subdistrict
Longzihu Subdistrict
Zhaicheng Road Subdistrict
Fenghuangtai Subdistrict
Yangjin Road Subdistrict
Fengqing Road Subdistrict

Former Subdistricts
Jicheng Road Subdistrict and Xingda Road Subdistrict

Education
The area around Jianxue Street, is a main educational area. The famous Henan Experimental Middle School, No.8 Middle School, No.9 Middle School, the Henan Foreign Trade School, Henan Experimental Primary School and the No.1 Primary School of Wenhua Road, Zhengzhou are in the district.

Gallery

References

External links
Official website of Jinshui District Government

Districts of Zhengzhou